Ecuador will participate in the 2011 Parapan American Games.

Athletics

Ecuador will send three male athletes to compete.

Swimming

Ecuador will send one female swimmer to compete.

Table tennis

Ecuador will send one male table tennis player to compete.

Wheelchair tennis

Ecuador will send two male athletes to compete.

Nations at the 2011 Parapan American Games
2011 in Ecuadorian sport
Ecuador at the Pan American Games